Seithenyn  (sometimes spelt Seithennin) sometimes known as Seithenyn of the feeble mind is a figure from Welsh legend, apparently contemporary with King Gwyddno Garanhir. He is mentioned in a poem in the Llyfr Du Caerfyrddin (Black Book of Carmarthen), but becomes the protagonist of the story in a later version of the legend, in which he was responsible for the sea-defences of Cantre'r Gwaelod or Maes Gwyddno, in the kingdom of the legendary Gwyddno Garanhir, but neglected them one night because of his drunkenness. Because of this neglect, the sea overran it.

Cantre'r Gwaelod is said to lie beneath the waters of Cardigan Bay off the coast of Ceredigion near Aberdyfi, Wales. Seithenyn (named in some later sources as being the son of Seithyn Saidi), was in charge of the embankment there, and as such, it was his failure to discharge his duties which led to its drowning. Seithenyn is also listed in the Triads of the Island of Britain as one of the Three Disgraceful Drunkards of the Isle of Britain.

The Welsh saint Saint Tudno (founder and patron of Llandudno) may have been Seithenyn's son.

He appears as a character in Thomas Love Peacock's 1829 Arthurian novel The Misfortunes of Elphin.

Sir John Rhys posited a connection between Seithenyn and the Setantii, a Celtic tribe living in what is now the north west of England.

Notes

References

Bibliography

Medieval Welsh literature
Welsh-language literature
Welsh mythology